Elections for Cambridge City Council (in Cambridge, England) were held on Thursday 3 May 2012.  One third of the council was up for election and the Liberal Democrats lost overall control of the council, to No Overall Control.

Election result

The Liberal Democrats retained control of the Council, with the casting vote of the Mayor, though they lost a majority. The overall turnout was 32.2%,

Ward results

Note: in results where, in previous elections, two seats were up for election the party share of the vote is based on an average for those candidates who stood for that particular party in the election.

Unless stated otherwise, changes in party vote is in comparison with the 2011 Cambridge City Council election results.

Abbey ward

Councillor Margaret Wright retired her Abbey seat. William Birkin was aiming to retain the vacated seat for the Greens.

Arbury ward

Councillor Mike Todd-Jones was defending his Arbury seat for the Labour and Co-operative Party.

Castle ward

Councillor John Hipkin was defending his Castle seat as an independent candidate. Changes in vote is in comparison to 2008, when John Hipkin's seat was last contested.

Cherry Hinton ward

Councillor Robert Dryden was defending his Cherry Hinton seat for Labour.

Coleridge ward

Councillor George Owers was defending his Coleridge seat for Labour, having gained it in a 2010 by-election.

East Chesterton ward

Councillor Roman Znajek retired his East Chesterton seat. Tony Morris was aiming to retain the vacated seat for the Liberal Democrats.

King's Hedges ward

Councillor Neil McGovern was defending his King's Hedges seat for the Liberal Democrats.

Market ward

Councillor Tim Bick was defending his Market seat for the Liberal Democrats.

Newnham ward

Councillor Sian Reid was defending her Newnham seat for the Liberal Democrats.

Petersfield ward

Councillor Gail Marchant-Daisley was defending her Petersfield seat for Labour.

Queen Edith's ward

Councillor Amanda Taylor was defending her Queen Edith's seat for the Liberal Democrats.

Romsey ward

Councillor Catherine Smart was defending her Romsey seat for the Liberal Democrats.

Trumpington ward

Councillor Salah Al Bander was defending his Trumpington seat for the Liberal Democrats.

West Chesterton ward

Councillor Ian Nimmo-Smith retired his West Chesterton seat. Mike Pitt was aiming to retain the vacated seat for the Liberal Democrats.

By-elections

Abbey

A by-election was called due to the resignation of incumbent Green Party councillor Adam Pogonowski.

References

2012 English local elections
2012
2010s in Cambridge